The Taite Music Prize is an annual New Zealand music award event. It features the same-named prize awarded for the best album from New Zealand.

The prize is named after respected New Zealand music journalist and broadcaster Dylan Taite, who died in 2003. The Taite Music Prize was established in 2009 in his honour by Independent Music New Zealand (IMNZ) in conjunction with the Taite family. The first prize was awarded in 2010. The Taite takes its inspiration from successful international prizes such as the Mercury Prize in the UK and the Australian Music Prize.

The Taite Music Prize 

The award carries a cash prize of NZ$10,000 and sponsors' prizes. It is primarily sponsored by Recorded Music NZ (formerly known as PPNZ Music Licensing). The award is judged on originality, creativity, and musicianship displayed on an album, rather than on sales or commercial factors.

The prize shortlist is decided by a group of IMNZ members and 10 outside judges, including musicians, music journalists and music industry personnel. The prize winner is decided by a 10-person judging panel chosen by IMNZ.

Other awards 

In 2013 a second award was added to the Taite Music Prize event. The Independent Music NZ Classic Record award honours a previously released album that is now considered a classic, and the award aims to "acknowledge New Zealand’s rich history of making fine albums that continue to inspire us and that also define who we are." Like the Taite Music Prize, it is selected by music media and music industry specialists. The inaugural recipient of the Classic Record award was the Gordons' 1981 album Gordons.

In 2017, a third award was added to the Taites. The Best Independent Debut Award honours the best debut release of an artist that is on a member label of Independent Music New Zealand. The winner receives a $2000 cash prize and a performance slot in the annual Summer In The Square festival. This prize was awarded for the first time in 2017 to Merk for Swordfish.

An Outstanding Music Journalism Award was added in 2022. The winner receives a $2500 cash prize. The first recipient was RNZ music journalist Tony Stamp.

History 

In 2014, Lorde, the winner of the Taite Music Prize, asked that the $10,000 cash prize, studio time and other sponsors' prizes be split among the seven other nominees, saying, "I think everyone is kind of sick of me winning stuff at the moment and other people are in more in need of the funds and exposure right now."

The Nielson brothers, Ruban and Kody, formerly of The Mint Chicks, have each won the Taite Music Prize for their different music projects. Ruban as Unknown Mortal Orchestra in 2012 and Kody as Silicon in 2016.

The most nominations have gone to @Peace, David Dallas, Lawrence Arabia, The Phoenix Foundation and Unknown Mortal Orchestra, who have each been nominated for three different albums. Of those, only Lawrence Arabia and Unknown Mortal Orchestra have won the prize, once each.

Winners and shortlisted nominees

Independent Music NZ Classic Record award

Best Independent Debut Award

References

External links 

 Taite Music Prize (Independent Music NZ)

Music Awards, New Zealand
New Zealand music awards